The 1946–47 Scottish Division A was the first season of competitive football in Scotland after World War II. It was won by Rangers by two points over nearest rival Hibernian. Kilmarnock and Hamilton Academical finished 15th and 16th respectively and were relegated to the 1947–48 Scottish Division B.

League table

Results

References 

 Scottish Football Archive

1946–47 Scottish Football League
Scottish Division One seasons
Scot